Mallamada Narendra Ponnamma (born 25 October 1992) is an Indian field hockey player, who plays as a halfback for the Indian national team. She was a part of the team that won bronze at the 2013 Junior World Cup, in Germany.

Early life and career
Ponnamma was born on 25 October 1992 in Kodagu district, in the Indian State of Karnataka, into Mallamada family of the Kodava community. Born to a family of hockey players, her father Narendra, played hockey during his time in the Indian armed forces; her mother, during her college days; and her older sister, who gave up the game after sustaining an injury. Influenced towards the game by her father, Ponnamma was selected by and began training with Madikeri branch of Sports Authority of India, in 2005. After having been noticed for her performances at tournaments at the district level, she was chosen to play for Karnataka in its senior team, at the national-level, and would go on to captain the team as well. She was eventually chosen to represent India in its junior and senior teams, in 2011.

References

External links
 M. N. Poovamma profile at Hockey India

Living people
1992 births
People from Kodagu district
Kodava people
Field hockey players from Karnataka
Indian female field hockey players
Sportswomen from Karnataka
21st-century Indian women
21st-century Indian people
South Asian Games gold medalists for India
South Asian Games medalists in field hockey